mink (real name Lee Mink; 이밍크, born February 15, 1984, in Cheonghak-dong, Incheon, South Korea) is a female, Korean-born Japanese pop singer. Her name means "Made in Korea", and she only sings in Japanese and English. Contrary to her heritage, she has not performed or recorded any songs in Korean.

mink has been inactive since the release of her best album ("BEST OF MY LOVE") on December 10, 2008. There have been no further releases or updates since, and her official site no longer exists.

Career

mink was born and raised in Korea before traveling to Japan to further her education. While in Japan, she submitted demo tracks of "Don't know why", "When You Believe", and "Namida Sousou" to Avex Trax, one of Japan's leading J-pop labels. She was signed with them soon after.

In August 2005, her debut album "mink" was released and received a good reception while featuring "Beautiful", a song used for the film Initial D: The Movie. The album also included covers of "I Can't Tell You Why", "Don't You Worry 'Bout a Thing", "Suki", and "More than Words". In October, mink performed live in the "es sadaharu hoshino" Paris collection held in Paris, France.

In early 2006, her song "Glory of Life" from her debut album was released and licensed to Rhythm Zone/King Street Records and remixed by Chris Cox, John Creamer and Stephane K.  This song hit the #1 position on the U.S. Billboard Hot Dance Club Play chart. This placed her alongside Kumi Koda ("Trust Your Love") and Hikaru Utada ("Devil Inside"). as one of the first Asian Artists to have a #1 single in the USA. In March, she participated in the "Winter Music Conference" in Miami, USA. She was ranked 8th in the 2006 USEN Japanese Music Total HIT Ranking.

To follow her American success, her second single "4 Love" was originally scheduled to be co-released in the USA. However, it was later canceled and only released only in Japan. mink's "Eternal Love" from that single was remixed and used for the film Chisaki Yusha Tachi Gamera.  In December, her "Here by my side" was used as the theme song for the 3D animated short Joe and Marilyn, part of the omnibus film Amazing Nuts! produced by Studio 4°C. This song was later released on her third album, "Shalom".

In January 2007, mink's "Innocent Blue -Chi Hate Umi Tsukiru Made-" was released as the theme song for the Japan-Mongol epic film, Aoki Ookami. Her song "Together again" was used in "Vexil -2077 Nihon Sengoku" and released in August.

In March 2008, she received the "Film Music Artist Award" during the 17th Japan Film Critics Award.

Discography

Japanese Albums
mink (RZCD-45228, Released on August 3, 2005)
e+motion (RZCD-45314, Released on December 7, 2005)
Shalom (RZCD-45516, February 28, 2007)
mink II ～endless love～ (RZCD-45754, April 23, 2008)
BEST OF MY LOVE (RZCD-46081, December 10, 2008)

Special Album Releases
minkREMIX (RR12-88477, released on January 20, 2006, 12' ANALOG RELEASE by Rhythm REPUBLIC)

Japanese Singles
栄光の花 ("Glory of Life")
おまじない ("Good-luck Charm")
Rescue Me
Beautiful / One Suitcase (Maxi-single) (RZCD-45267, October 5, 2005)
4 Love (RZCD-45342, April 19, 2006)
Hold on to a Dream (RZCD-45425, August 23, 2006)
Innocent Blue ~Chi Hate Umi Tsukiru Made~ (RCZD-45483/B, January 1, 2007)
Together Again (RZCD-45647, August 8, 2007)
Sense (RZCD-45680, October 31, 2007)

US Singles
Glory of Life (Chris Cox Anthem Club Mix) (English Version, April 2006)

See also
List of number-one dance hits (United States)
List of artists who reached number one on the US Dance chart

References

External links
Official website (in Japanese)
J!-ENT article on "Amazing Nuts!" featuring mink

1984 births
Living people
South Korean dance musicians
South Korean expatriates in Japan
South Korean women singers
South Korean J-pop singers
Japanese women pop singers
Musicians from Incheon
21st-century Japanese singers
21st-century Japanese women singers
21st-century South Korean singers